The Colonial sloop Norfolk was built on Norfolk Island in 1798 of Norfolk Island Pine. She was wrecked in 1800.

"The necessity of a vessel to keep up a more frequent intercourse with Norfolk Island, ...having been much felt by the want of various stores ...occasioned Captain Townson, the Commanding officer, to construct a small decked boat, sloop rigged, in which he sent His letters to this port..."
Cumpston describes Norfolk as, “A decked longboat built at Norfolk I[sland].” Governor Hunter quickly put Norfolk under the command of Matthew Flinders, the Sailing Master Peter Hibbs (seaman formerly on the "Sirius") Norfolk was to be used as a survey vessel. In 1798-99 Norfolk was used by Flinders and Bass to circumnavigate Tasmania – proving the existence of Bass Strait. Flinders also took Norfolk north to chart Cook's Morton's Bay (now Moreton Bay) and Hervey's Bay (Hervey Bay).

Norfolk was then used to supply produce from the Windsor Area to Port Jackson, until 1800 when convicts seized her at the mouth of the Hawkesbury River. Intending to sail her to Maluku,  the convicts ran her aground at what was later called "Pirate Point" on the northern side of the mouth to the Hunter River.

Replica
In 1998-99 Bern Cuthbertson OAM from Sandy Bay, Tasmania, re-enacted all of Norfolks journeys in a replica vessel, constructed of Tasmania Huon and Celery Top pines. The replica Norfolk is now on display at The Bass and Flinders Centre in George Town on Tasmania's Tamar River.

A limited amount of sterling silver and 18-carat gold medallions were hand-made to commemorate the voyages of Bern Cuthbertson's Norfolk. These medallions were mainly given to those that sailed with Bern.

In 2000 the Queensland Place Names Board named Norfolk Point which was on reclaimed land in the Manly boat harbour in Moreton Bay in honour of Matthew Flinders and the replica's visit. A plaque on the point commemorates the naming.

Affiliations
TS Norfolk, Australian Navy Cadets

References

1798 ships
Ships built in Norfolk Island
Sloops of Australia
History of Australia (1788–1850)
Maritime incidents in 1800
Napoleonic-era ships
Shipwrecks of the Hunter Region
1788–1850 ships of Australia
Maritime exploration of Australia
History of Newcastle, New South Wales